In enzymology, a 3-oxo-5beta-steroid 4-dehydrogenase is an enzyme that catalyzes the chemical reaction

a 3-oxo-5beta-steroid + acceptor  a 3-oxo-Delta4-steroid + reduced acceptor

Thus, the two substrates of this enzyme are 3-oxo-5beta-steroid and acceptor, whereas its two products are 3-oxo-Delta4-steroid and reduced acceptor.

This enzyme belongs to the family of oxidoreductases, to be specific, those acting on the CH-CH group of donor with other acceptors.  The systematic name of this enzyme class is 3-oxo-5beta-steroid:acceptor Delta4-oxidoreductase. This enzyme is also called 3-oxo-5beta-steroid:(acceptor) Delta4-oxidoreductase.  This enzyme participates in 3 metabolic pathways: bile acid biosynthesis, c21-steroid hormone metabolism, and androgen and estrogen metabolism.

References

 

EC 1.3.99
Enzymes of unknown structure